Marché Plus is a French superette supermarket chain. It franchises its name to small-format grocery stores in France. It is a part of the Carrefour Group. The head office is in Levallois-Perret.

References

External links

 Marché Plus 
 Galinier, Pascal. Carrefour, inventeur de l'hypermarché, se convertit au supermarché. Le Monde. 30 August 1998.

Carrefour
Supermarkets of France